The side effects of penicillin are bodily responses to penicillin and closely related antibiotics that do not relate directly to its effect on bacteria. A side effect is an effect that is not intended with normal dosing.  Some of these reactions are visible and some occur in the body's organs or blood. Penicillins are a widely used group of medications that are effective for the treatment of a wide variety of bacterial infections in human adults and children as well as other species. Some side effects are predictable, of which some are common but not serious, some are uncommon and serious and others are rare. The route of administration of penicillin can have an effect on the development of side effects. An example of this is irritation and inflammation that develops at a peripheral infusion site when penicillin is administered intravenously. In addition, penicillin is available in different forms. There are different penicillin medications (penicillin G benzathine, penicillin G potassium, Penicillin G sodium, penicillin G procaine, and penicillin V) as well as a number of β-lactam antibiotics derived from penicillin (e.g. amoxicillin).

Side effects may only last for a short time and then go away. Side effects can be relieved in some cases with non pharmacological treatment. Some side effects require treatment to correct potentially serious and sometimes fatal reactions to penicillin. Penicillin has not been found to cause birth defects.

Allergies and cross sensitivities
Many people have indicated that they have a side effect related to an allergic reaction to penicillin. It has been proposed that as many as 90% of those claiming to have an allergy to penicillin are able to take it and do not have a true allergy. Research has suggested that having penicillin allergy incorrectly noted in the medical records can have negative consequences.

Identifying an allergy to penicillin requires a hypersensitivity skin test, which diagnoses IgE-mediated immune responses caused by penicillin. This test is typically performed by an allergist who uses a  skin-prick and intradermal injection of penicilloyl-polylysine, a negative control (normal saline), and a positive control (histamine).

A small proportion of people who are allergic to penicillins also have similar cross sensitivities to other antibiotics such as cephalosporins. If someone has developed side effects when taking penicillin, these side effects may develop with a new medication even though the person has not taken the new medication before. Those medications that may cause a cross sensitivity reaction are: carbapenems, ampicillin, cefazolin, cephalosporins and cloxacillin.

Side effects in adults
Common adverse drug reactions (≥ 1% of people) associated with use of the penicillins include diarrhea, hypersensitivity, nausea, rash, neurotoxicity, urticaria (hives), and superinfection (including candidiasis). Infrequent adverse effects (0.1–1% of people) include fever, vomiting, erythema, dermatitis, angioedema, seizures (especially in people with epilepsy), and pseudomembranous colitis.[subscription required][outdated?]

Very common (>10% incidence) 

diarrhea
epigastric distress
nausea
vomiting
pseudomembranous colitis
interstitial nephritis
rash
urticaria (hives)
eosinophilia
leukopenia (decrease in white blood cells)
allergic reactions
superinfection

Common (1-10% incidence)

yeast infection
lack of therapeutic effect
vaginal itching
vaginal discharge 
white patches in the mouth and tongue

Uncommon (<1%)

wheezing
fever
joint pain
lightheadedness
fainting
facial edema (puffiness of the face)
red, scaly skin
shortness of breath
skin rash, hives
irregular breathing

Life threatening
anaphylaxis
serum sickness
seizures
laryngeal edema

Rare (<0.1%) 

tooth discoloration
erythema multiforme
vertigo
decreased platelet count
tinnitus
convulsions
hypertonia
cardiac arrest
cyanosis
palpitations
chest pain
macular rash
yellow eyes or skin
stomach or abdominal cramps
severe abdominal pain
bloody diarrhea
depression
decreased urine excretion
sore throat
bleeding or bruising
agitation
combativeness
anxiety
confusion
hallucinations

High doses
When penicillin is used at high doses hypokalemia, metabolic acidosis, and hyperkalemia can occur. Developing hypernatremia after administering high doses of penicillin can be a serious side effect.

Side effects from other medications
The side effects of penicillin can be altered by taking other medications at the same time. Taking oral contraceptives along with penicillin may lower the effects of the contraceptive. When probenecid is used concurrently with penicillin, kidney excretion of probenecid is decreased resulting in higher blood levels of penicillin in the circulation. In some instances, this would be an intended therapeutic effect. In other instances, this is an unintended side effect. Neomycin can lower the absorption of penicillin from the gastrointestinal tract resulting in lower than expected levels of penicillin in the circulation. This side effect may result in an ineffective therapeutic effect of penicillin. When methotrexate is administered with penicillin, toxicity may occur related to methotrexate.

In animals
Animals are often treated with antibiotics for infections they have developed. There are side effects of penicillin when it is used in animals. MRSA may develop in pets as a consequence of treatment. Nutritional deficiencies can develop in pets as a side effect. Destruction of the normal protective flora of beneficial bacteria can occur in dogs and horses.
Dogs may have side effects that include: joint pain, loss of appetite, vomiting, flatulence (intestinal gas), fungal infections and digestive problems. Like humans, dogs can have a similar side effect related to developing a serious allergy. A serious and possibly fatal anaphylactic can occur. Side effects that are concurrent with anaphylaxis include: breathing problems and shock.

Cats and dogs have had adverse reactions to intravenous penicillin that include: hypothermia, pruritus, hypotension, tremors, seizures, blindness, vocalization, agitation, cardiac arrest and transient loss of vision.

Other side effects 
Penicillin is known to become less effective as strains of bacteria become resistant.

References

Bibliography

External links

 Model of Structure of Penicillin, by Dorothy Hodgkin et al., Museum of the History of Science, Oxford
 Food and Drug Administration (US) information on Penicillin

 
Eli Lilly and Company brands
Scottish inventions
Microbiology
Science and technology during World War II
Side effects
Secondary metabolites
Pfizer brands
World Health Organization essential medicines
Medication side effects